A Schnorr group, proposed by Claus P. Schnorr, is a large prime-order subgroup of , the multiplicative group of integers modulo  for some prime .

Then choose any  in the range  until you find one such that

.

This value

Schnorr groups are useful in discrete log based cryptosystems including Schnorr signatures and DSA. In such applications, typically  is chosen to be large enough to resist index calculus and related methods of solving the discrete-log problem (perhaps 1024 to 3072 bits), while  is large enough to resist the birthday attack on discrete log problems, which works in any group (perhaps 160 to 256 bits). Because the Schnorr group is of prime order, it has no non-trivial proper subgroups, thwarting  confinement attacks due to small subgroups. Any member of the group except the element  is also a generator of the group.

Asymmetric-key algorithms
Number theory
Group theory